Guo Yi may refer to:

 Guo Yi (Three Kingdoms), minister of the state of Cao Wei during the Three Kingdoms period
 Guo Yi (footballer) (born 1993), Chinese footballer
Guo Yi (musician) (born 1954), Chinese musician